Braniff International Airways Flight 250 crashed near Falls City, Nebraska, on August 6, 1966, en route to Omaha from Kansas City, Missouri. Thirty-eight passengers and four crew members were killed in the crash, which occurred in a farm field late on a Saturday night. In-flight structural failure due to extreme turbulence in an avoidable weather hazard was cited as the cause.

Aircraft 
The aircraft was a BAC 1-11-203AE, registration .  It was manufactured by British Aircraft Corporation in December 1965.

Flight crew
The cockpit crew consisted of Captain Donald Pauly, 47, and First Officer James Hilliker, 39. 

Captain Pauly was highly experienced with 20,767 flying hours, 549 of which were in the BAC-1-11. He possessed type ratings in other aircraft including the DC-3, DC-6, DC-7, and the Convair family. 

First Officer Hilliker was less experienced, with 9,269 flying hours, 685 in the BAC-1-11. According to the NTSB report, he had two type ratings in the BAC-1-11 and the Convair family.

Flight 
(All times Central Standard Time (UTC–6); Daylight time was used only in Minnesota along the flight's route until 1967.)

Flight 250 was operated by Braniff between New Orleans and Minneapolis with stops in between at Shreveport, Fort Smith, Tulsa, Kansas City, and Omaha. It departed Kansas City at 22:55 on an IFR clearance to Omaha at FL200. However, the crew asked if they could remain at  because of the weather. The flight remained at  until permission was received at 23:06 to descend to 5,000 feet. At 23:08, the crew contacted a Braniff flight that had just departed Omaha's Eppley Airfield, which reported moderate to light turbulence. 

About four minutes later, Flight 250 entered an updraft within an area of active squall line of severe thunderstorms. The 1-11 violently accelerated upward and in a left roll. At this time the right tailplane and the vertical stabilizer failed. The aircraft then pitched nose down and within one or two seconds the right wing failed as well. The plane tumbled down in flames until entering a flat spin before impacting the ground, approximately midway between Kansas City and Omaha. The probable cause was in-flight structural failure caused by extreme turbulence during operation of the aircraft in an area of avoidable hazardous weather.

The farm owner and his family were returning home in an automobile at the time of impact (23:12), and were about a half-mile (0.8 km) away.

Investigation 
Braniff regulations prohibited a plane from being dispatched into an area with a solid line of thunderstorms; nonetheless, the company forecast was somewhat inaccurate with respect to the number and intensity of thunderstorms and the intensity of the associated turbulence. Braniff dispatchers were aware that their flight 255 had delayed departing Sioux City for Omaha by one hour to allow the storm to pass Omaha; they also knew that their flight 234 from St. Louis to Des Moines had diverted to Kansas City due to the storm. They did not inform the crew of these events believing they were too far from the route of flight 250 to be relevant.  The crew was aware of the severe weather, however, and the first officer suggested that they divert around the activity.  The captain instead elected to continue the flight into the edges of the squall line.

Dr. Ted Fujita, a renowned weather researcher and professor of meteorology at the University of Chicago, was hired by British Aircraft Corporation, the manufacturer of the BAC 1-11, to study how the weather affected the jet. Dr. Fujita is recognized as the discoverer of downbursts and microbursts and also developed the Fujita scale, which differentiates tornado intensity and links tornado damage with wind speed.

Notably, the accident was the first with a U.S.-registered aircraft in which a cockpit voice recorder (CVR) was used to aid in the investigation. Just before the breakup, the device recorded Captain Pauly instructing First Officer Hilliker to adjust the engine power settings. He was interrupted mid-sentence by buffeting so severe that no more dialog could be discerned on the recording, which continued even after the wings and tail separated from the aircraft. Since the flight data recorder (FDR) was destroyed in the crash, the changes in the buffeting sound would later be used to estimate the airplane's changes in speed and altitude during the accident sequence.

Aftermath 

At its fortieth anniversary in 2006, a memorial was placed at the crash site. A fiftieth anniversary memorial event, planned by the county's historical society, was attended by a hundred in 2016.

In popular culture 

This crash is covered in detail in the book Air Disaster (Vol. 1) by Macarthur Job, illustrated by Matthew Tesch, and also in Deadly Turbulence: The Air Safety Lessons of Braniff Flight 250 and Other Airliners, 1959-1966, by Steve Pollock.

The U.S. television drama Mad Men referenced this accident briefly in the season 5 episode "Signal 30". In the series, client Mohawk Airlines also operated the BAC 1-11.

See also 
 List of accidents and incidents involving commercial aircraft

References

External links
 NTSB brief of the accident National Transportation Safety Board

 DeadlyTurbulence.com - Braniff Flight 250
 BAC 111 N1553 BraniffPages.com
 Braniff 250 Pilotfriend 
 Aviation Safety Network - Braniff - N1553
 Nebraska Air Crash - Braniff Airways - Flight 250

Aviation accidents and incidents in 1966
1966 in Nebraska
1966 meteorology
250
Airliner accidents and incidents in Nebraska
Airliner accidents and incidents caused by in-flight structural failure
Airliner accidents and incidents caused by weather
Disasters in Nebraska
Accidents and incidents involving the BAC One-Eleven
Richardson County, Nebraska
Braniff
August 1966 events in the United States